Honeymoon is a 2018 Indian Bengali language comedy drama film directed by Premendu Bikash Chaki and produced by Nispal Singh under the banner of Surinder Films. It is starring Soham Chakraborty, Subhashree Ganguly, Ranjit Mullick and Rudranil Ghosh in a lead role.  The film was released on 23 February 2018.

Cast
 Soham Chakraborty as Gitin
 Subhashree Ganguly as Jayati
 Ranjit Mullick as Pranesh Bhattacharya
 Rudranil Ghosh
 Rahul Chakraborty

Reception
Debolina Sen of Times of India granted the film three stars out of five and noted "From the title, you would expect it to be a romantic-genre film unless you are aware of the fact that it is a Samaresh Basu-inspired story that has been earlier made into a Soumitra Chatterjee-Aparna Sen-Utpal Dutt starrer, Chhutir Phande (1975)."

References

External links
 

2018 films
Bengali-language Indian films
2010s Bengali-language films